The Swartz Center for Entrepreneurship is an entrepreneurship school and technology startup accelerator at Carnegie Mellon University. It has helped to launch over 1,000 companies including Duolingo, and reCAPTCHA. It provides Carnegie Mellon affiliated startups with mentorship, investment, and space.

History 

The Swartz Center is named after Carnegie Mellon University alumnus Jim Swartz (MSIA’66) who co-founded Accel in 1983. Swartz's gift of $31 million in 2015 created a dedicated center to house entreprenial programs at the university. The permanent facility is located in the David Tepper Quadrangle. Artitects designed the center to be unique from the rest of the building giving it a pretuding design. Although it is located in the David A. Tepper Building, it operates independently from the Tepper School of Business.

The creation of the Swartz Center considated several of CMU's entrepreneurship programs including Donald H. Jones Center for Entrepreneurship (DJC), Carnegie Mellon University's Collaborative Innovation Center (CIC), and Center for Innovation and Entrepreneurship (CIE). The grand opening was October 25, 2016. Though the center does not cater to a specific business type, it has become a hub for AI and robotics startups.

Dave Mawhinney became the executive director of the center which was a continuation of his role at the Donald H. Jones Center for Entrepreneurship. The 2010s saw a surge of self-employment with many students running startups. Mawhinney would comment, "Self-employment has become more mainstream among undergraduates." citing the advancements in technology. Since 2020, Mawinney has been focused on bringing more venture capital to the Pittsburgh region. He cites that Carnegie Mellon affiliated self-driving startups alone brought in over $7B in the last few years.

Programs 
The Swartz Center offers various programs to support the entreprenial community in Pittsburgh. The major ones are: McGinnis Venture Competition, Project Olympus, and Venture Bridge.

Project Olympus 
Project Olympus is a satellite startup incubator providing mentorship, micro-grants, and co-working space to Carnegie Mellon University affiliated founders. Kit Needham serves as the Director. Each Spring, it hosts a public "Show and Tell" demo day where companies unveil new technologies.

McGinnis Venture Competition 
The McGinnis Venture Competition is a yearly entrepreneurship contest where students compete for over $60,000 in investment funds. The contest has two separate tracks for graduate and undergraduate students. Judges are entrepreneurs who achieved successful exits with their startups.

In 2022, winners included blockchain tech and life sciences.

VentureBridge 
VentureBridge is a program for startups with alumni co-founders. It provides seed funding along with incubation space in San Francisco, New York, and Pittsburgh. It is geared towards connecting founders with Angel investors and Venture Capital. Around 12 startups a year graduate from the program.

Companies and people 
Entrepreneurs-in-residence include: Steve Bollinger, Meredith Meyer Grelli known for Wigle Whiskey, William Kaigler, Foo Conner, Craig S. Markovitz, and Rob Myer known for NoWait which was acquired by Yelp. Notable companies include: Duolingo, ModCloth, CoPilot Fitness, Mach9 Robotics.

See also
 Business School
 Tepper School of Business
 List of Carnegie Mellon University people

References

External links
 

Business incubators of the United States
Business schools in Pennsylvania
Schools and departments of Carnegie Mellon
Startup accelerators
Venture capital firms of the United States